Chandi Mandir (Hindi, Mandir: "Temple") is a Hindu temple dedicated to Chandi the goddess of power, near Chandigarh, located on NH-5 Chandigarh-Kalka highway in Panchkula city of Haryana state of India. It is about 15 km from the city of Chandigarh, which was named after the temple, and about 10 km away from the Mansa Devi Shrine. The temple is situated amidst beautiful surroundings and the backdrop of the Shivalik hills.

Locations 
Chandi Mandir lies in the Chandimandir Cantonment which is home of Western Command of the Indian army.

Temple 

The Chandi Mandir is managed by the Shri Mata Mansa Devi Shrine Board. The temple has statues of various Hindu deities including Chandi, Radha Krishna, Hanuman, Shiva and Ram.

Festivals 

During the festival of Durga Puja during Navratras, thousands of people visit this temple.

Other Chandi temples in India 

Other popular Chandi Devi temples in India are:

 Katak Chandi Temple, Cuttack in Odisha state
 Chandi Devi Temple, Haridwar in Uttrakhand state

See also

 Religious tourism
 Saktism
 Yatra

References 

Hindu pilgrimage sites
Hindu temples in Haryana
Hindu temples in Chandigarh
Tourist attractions in Haryana
Panchkula